The Poughkeepsie Tapes is a 2007 American pseudo-documentary horror film written and directed by John Erick Dowdle. The film is about the murders of a serial killer in Poughkeepsie, New York, told through interviews and footage from a cache of the killer's snuff films.

The film premiered at the 2007 Tribeca Film Festival, but had a troubled release history; it was originally slated for theatrical release by Metro-Goldwyn-Mayer in February 2008, but was removed from the release schedule. The film had a brief video-on-demand release in 2014, but remained unavailable on home media. In October 2017, the film was released and remastered on DVD and Blu-ray by Scream Factory, via the newly-revived Orion Pictures.

Plot
When police raid a house in Poughkeepsie, New York, they discover over 800 videotapes shot by serial killer Edward Carver, which present a visual record of his murders, filmed in full from the point of abduction to the postmortem mutilation of the victim. Despite the volume of evidence, Carver is careful not to be shown on film unless fully disguised, leading to police and law enforcement beginning an investigation into his whereabouts and the whereabouts of his victims.

The first tape records the murder of his first victim, an eight-year-old girl whom he abducts, rapes, and murders. After the success of his first crime, Carver becomes more meticulous. He convinces a couple, the Andersons, to give him a ride, before clubbing the man and subduing the woman with chloroform. He then performs a Caesarian section on the woman, placing the severed head of her husband inside her womb before sewing her up, waking her, and filming her reaction. Carver shows himself in the CCTV footage of another gas station, using sign language to reveal the location of the bodies.

Carver's next victim is teenager Cheryl Dempsey. He murders and mutilates her boyfriend Tim and imprisons Cheryl in his basement, abusing her sexually, physically and psychologically as his "slave". Cheryl's mother Victoria appeals to her kidnapper in a televised statement. He goes to see her, offering to help while filming her. Victoria realizes that he is her daughter's captor and stands shocked as he laughs and flees.

With his crimes gaining a rising level of attention, Carver changes his modus operandi and begins targeting sex workers while posing as a police officer; he is dubbed the "Water Street Butcher". The police investigating the murders are led to officer James Foley; because Foley has a history of purchasing sex, is mentioned in eyewitness statements, has no alibi and has matching sperm samples, he is convicted and sentenced to death in 1996. Foley continues to plead his innocence and refuses to make any plea deals. He is executed by lethal injection on September 9, 2001. Days later, his former partner finds a map in his mailbox with the location of another body. The real killer had presumably taken Foley's sperm from a fertility clinic and framed him. Foley is exonerated of the murders on September 12; but because of the proximity to the September 11 attacks, this goes unrecognized by the public.

After another murder, the police reverse-engineer the killer's map search and Cheryl is discovered in his empty house. She is rescued but is irreversibly damaged from her ordeal, suffering from malnourishment and harming herself in secret. In an interview, she identifies with her captor and defends him, saying that he loved her. Two weeks later, she dies by suicide. Her body is exhumed after its burial, with a tape left in her empty coffin. The investigators ponder where Carver is and assert that he will watch the documentary. A post-credits scene shows a restrained woman being filmed by Carver, who says she will be allowed to live for as long as she does not blink. The film then cuts to black just as the woman's eyes uncontrollably shut.

Cast

Release
The Poughkeepsie Tapes premiered at the Tribeca Film Festival in May 2007. It was scheduled for a theatrical release by Metro-Goldwyn-Mayer (MGM) on February 8, 2008. The film, however, was removed from the release schedule, in spite of promotional advertising.

In July 2014, the film was given its first official release as a video-on-demand title available through DirecTV. It was subsequently pulled again less than a month later with Dowdle suggesting that MGM was considering a wider release.

Critical reception
Michael Gingold of Rue Morgue called the film "a creepy yet frustrating experience", criticizing it for not giving enough "insight into the reasons why [the villain] brutalized and slew his victims". Brian Orndorf of Blu-ray.com gave the film a rating of 4 out of 10 stars, writing that the film "teases a few interesting directions" but "loses tension the longer it recycles the same beats of distress, selecting a cheap way to disturb its audience."

Bloody Disgusting gave the film a score of 4 out of 5, calling it "one of the best indie films" of 2007 and writing that "the movie is scary, creepy, unnerving, bizarre and very uncomfortable to watch." Michele "Izzy" Galgana of Screen Anarchy called it "definitely not a film for everyone, particularly those who have a low threshold for violence and torture. For those who love true crime and found footage films, [The Poughkeepsie Tapes] is a treasure."

Home media
The film was released on DVD and Blu-ray by Scream Factory on October 10, 2017.

Notes

References

External links
 
 

2007 films
2007 horror films
2000s American films
2000s English-language films
2000s serial killer films
American horror films
American mockumentary films
American serial killer films
Cultural depictions of Ted Bundy
Films about snuff films
Films shot in Minnesota
Films shot in New York (state)
Films directed by John Erick Dowdle
Found footage films
Grave-robbing in film
Metro-Goldwyn-Mayer films